Montaillou is a commune in the Ariège department in the south of France. Its original, medieval location was abandoned and the current village is a short distance away.

History

The village is best known for being the subject of Emmanuel Le Roy Ladurie's pioneering work of microhistory, Montaillou, village occitan. It analyzes the village in great detail over a thirty-year period from 1294 to 1324. Then a village of some 250 people, the daily routines of the people are in the records of Jacques Fournier, later Pope Benedict XII.

Montaillou was one of the last bastions of Albigensianism, the heresy also known as Catharism.  Fournier, then the local bishop, launched an extensive inquisition involving dozens of lengthy interviews with the locals, all of which were faithfully recorded, as well as the arrest of the entire village in 1318 (Le Roy Ladurie has 1308?).  When Fournier became Pope he took the records of the investigation with him and they remain in the Vatican Library.

The medieval village has been abandoned and the modern village is located a short distance downhill. There are visible remains of houses and there are also old tracks and field markings. In medieval times, the old village was guarded by the Château de Montaillou, now a ruin. The village church, dedicated to Notre Dame de Carnesses, remains in use.

Population

See also
Communes of the Ariège department

References

Emmanuel Le Roy Ladurie, Montaillou: The Promised Land of Error. translated by Barbara Bray. New York: G. Braziller, c1978.
 Emmanuel Le Roy Ladurie, ed., Autour de Montaillou - un village occitan; histoire et religiosité d'une communauté villageoise au Moyen Âge. Actes du colloque de Montaillou (25-26-27 août 2000). Castelnaud la Chapelle, 2001.

Communes of Ariège (department)
Catharism
Former populated places in France
Ariège communes articles needing translation from French Wikipedia